Ogurami Dam is an earthfill dam located in Fukui Prefecture in Japan. The dam is used for irrigation. The catchment area of the dam is 0.2 km2. The dam can store 60 thousand cubic meters of water. The construction of the dam was completed in 1900.

References

Dams in Fukui Prefecture
1900 establishments in Japan